Per Brogeland (born 27 January 1953) is a Norwegian football manager. He has been the head coach of Lillestrøm, among others.

He is among an exclusive group of Norwegians who have managed a top-flight team abroad, in Brogeland's case the Austrian LASK Linz. Controversially, however, he was sacked at a moment when the club was third in the league and had qualified for the quarter-finals of the cup.

Under Brogeland's command, the small club Kongsvinger IL were runners-up in the Norwegian Premier League in 1992. In the 1993 UEFA Cup, after having beaten Swedish Östers IF 7–2 on aggregate, Brogeland led Kongsvinger to a surprise draw against Juventus at home.

References

1953 births
Living people
Kniksen Award winners
Norwegian footballers
Association football midfielders
Norwegian football managers
Kongsvinger IL Toppfotball managers
Lillestrøm SK managers
LASK managers
Hønefoss BK managers
Lyn Fotball managers
Norwegian expatriate football managers
Norwegian expatriate sportspeople in Austria
Expatriate football managers in Austria